The Non Valley ( or ; Nones: Val de Nòn;  or) is a valley mainly in the Trentino.

The largest municipalities in the valley are Cles (the main town), Predaia, Ville d'Anaunia, Revò, Denno, Fondo.

There are a total of 29 municipalities:

Castelfondo
Fondo
Malosco
Brez
Sarnonico
Ronzone
Ruffrè-Mendola
Cavareno
Amblar-Don
Romeno
Rumo
Bresimo
Cis
Livo
Cagnò
Revò
Romallo
Dambel
Cloz
Sanzeno
Cles
Predaia
Sfruz
Ville d'Anaunia
Contà
Ton
Sporminore
Denno
Campodenno

The German-speaking  municipalities are:

Laurein
Proveis
Unsere Liebe Frau im Walde-St. Felix

The latter comune is connected to the rest of its province by the Gampenpass, while the other two are accessible through a tunnel under the Hofmahdjoch from the rest of South Tyrol since 1998. 

The Nones language is named after and spoken in the valley.

See also
 The Hidden Frontier, an ethnographic work

External links

 Tourist board of the Val di Non (mostly in Italian)

Valleys of Trentino
Nonsberg Group